Unbound Inc. is an American sexual wellness company based in New York. Unbound is better known for manufacturing women sexual accessories such as vibrators and lubricants. In 2018, the company was announced runner-up at the TechCrunch Disrupt - San Francisco.

History 

In 2012, entrepreneur Polly Rodriguez and Sarah Jayne Kinney founded the company. Unbound was started as a quarterly subscription box but later launched its own product line. In 2018, the company competed in TechCrunch Disrupt’s Battlefield competition and won 2nd place for their wearable, fashion-forward vibrator ring, Palma. The company were finalists at Disrupt SF, 2018.

In June 2017, Unbound Babes launched "Vibes for Congress", an initiative to support planned parenthood.

In May 2018, MTA rejected ads from Unbound for being too sexual.

Products 

Initially, Unbound offered women a sensual subscription service, which included several sexual stimulation aids. Notably, Unbound manufactured a geometric-shaped metallic vibrator ring named as Palma, which was well received among customers. Palma was designed by Julia Lopez.

References 

Sex toy manufacturers